The 60th District of the Iowa House of Representatives in the state of Iowa.

Current elected officials
Dave Williams is the representative currently representing the district.

Past representatives
The district has previously been represented by:
 Ed Skinner, 1971–1973
 Robert Kreamer, 1973–1977
 Douglas Smalley, 1977–1983
 Elaine Baxter, 1983–1987
 Dennis Cohoon, 1987–1993
 William Brand, 1993–1999
 Lance Horbach, 1999–2003
 Libby Jacobs, 2003–2009
 Doris Kelley, 2009-2012
 Walt Rogers, 2013–2019
 Dave Williams, 2019–present

References

060